Melanchroia is a genus of moths in the family of diurnal neotropical moths, Geometridae, and subfamily Ennominae. The genus was proposed by Jacob Hübner in 1819. Its species can be found from the southeastern United States to Argentina.

Species 
Melanchroia aterea
Melanchroia carbonaria
Melanchroia chephise
Melanchroia geometroides
Melanchroia regnatrix
Melanchroia tepens
Melanchroia vazquezae
Melanchroia venata

References

Boarmiini